Carstairs is a rural locality in the Shire of Burdekin, Queensland, Australia.

History 
The locality was named and bounded on 23 February 2001.

Geography
The Burdekin River forms the northern and eastern boundaries.

References 

Shire of Burdekin
Localities in Queensland